The Red Oak Creek Covered Bridge carries Covered Bridge Road (historically Huel Brown Road) across Red Oak Creek north of Woodbury, Georgia. It was listed on the National Register of Historic Places in 1973.

The bridge is a covered Town lattice truss and has also been known as Big Red Oak Creek Bridge.

It was probably built by Horace King, a slave, in about 1840.

It is held together by approximately 2,500 wooden pegs also known as trunnels.

When listed in 1973, the bridge was still in use. It was thought to possibly be the oldest covered bridge in Georgia, and to be "an outstanding reminder of the age when there were over 250 covered bridges in Georgia."

See also
List of bridges on the National Register of Historic Places in Georgia
List of bridges documented by the Historic American Engineering Record in Georgia (U.S. state)
List of covered bridges in Georgia

References

External links
Red Oak Creek Covered Bridge, YouTube video from 2013 by Lighthouse Lady
Flat Shoals-Flint River, Gay Georgia & Red Oak Creek Covered Bridge, YouTube video by drone from June 24, 2016 (bridge at 3:59 - 5:35)

Buildings and structures completed in 1840
Covered bridges in Georgia (U.S. state)
Historic American Engineering Record in Georgia (U.S. state)
National Register of Historic Places in Meriwether County, Georgia